Nils Olof Langert (11 June 1924 – 21 December 2016, Gothenburg, Sweden) was a Swedish painter and sculptor.

Langert created monumental works for public spaces and buildings of the municipality of Gothenburg.

His work is represented at the Museum of Modern Art of Stockholm, the Nationalmuseum, the Gothenburg Museum of Art, Borås, Malmö, Rønne (Denmark) and the Museum Folkwang in Essen, Germany.

References

External links 

 International Standard Name Identifier

1924 births
2016 deaths
20th-century Swedish painters
20th-century Swedish sculptors
Swedish male sculptors
20th-century Swedish male artists